Popular Unity (UP) was a left-wing political alliance in Chile that stood behind the successful candidacy of Salvador Allende for the 1970 Chilean presidential election.

History
Successor to the FRAP coalition, Popular Unity originally comprised most of the Chilean Left: the Socialist Party, the Communist Party, the Radical Party, the Social Democrat Party, the Independent Popular Action and MAPU (Movimiento de Acción Popular Unitario). They were later joined in 1971 by the Christian Left and in 1972 by the MAPU Obrero Campesino (a splinter group). UP also initially included the moderate Party of the Radical Left, but in 1972 it joined the opposition (inside the Confederation of Democracy).

UP's leader, Salvador Allende, was a Marxist who co-founded Chile's Socialist Party. His slight plurality in the election resulted in his confirmation as president by the National Congress of Chile. The loose and conditional support from the Christian Democratic Party that made this confirmation possible soon disintegrated, as did centrism of any viable kind in an atmosphere of increasing political polarization. The Revolutionary Left Movement clashed with the conservative and establishment forces, while armed right-wing elements plotted to destabilize the government with support from the Nixon administration. The Unidad Popular coalition itself experienced political conflicts. Generally, the Communist Party, the Radical Party and later MAPU/OC advocated more cautious policies, whereas a part of the Socialist Party supported more radical changes and were often supported by MAPU and Christian Left.

The Pact of Popular Unity (Pacto de la Unidad Popular) was signed on 26 December 1969 in Santiago by following representatives of political parties:

 Luis Corvalán, General Secretary of the Communist Party
 Aniceto Rodríguez, General Secretary of the Socialist Party
 Carlos Morales, President of the Radical Party
 Esteban Leyton, General Secretary of the Social Democratic Party
 Jaime Gazmuri, General Secretary of the Popular Unitary Action Movement
 Alfonso David Lebón, President of the Independent Popular Action

In August 1973 the Christian Democrats cooperated with the right-wing National Party in the congressional protest that set the stage for the Chilean coup of 1973, the effective end of the UP government and —for 17 years— of democracy in Chile.

Allende's administration 

Salvador Allende's election in 1970 represented several important developments internationally and domestically. He was the first democratically elected socialist leader in Latin America. In contrast with Fidel Castro's people's revolution from below, Allende proposed a peaceful transition to socialism through existing governmental structures: a revolution from above. Popular Unity had the support of the plurality of Chileans, and initially this support continued to grow. Allende was elected with 36% of the popular vote in 1970. Five months into his presidency, his approval rating had grown to 49%. This was where his support peaked. Following severe inflation and food shortages Allende's popularity started to dip. The Popular Unity did not win the majority in the 1973 election. Eventually anti-socialist elements in the military, with support from US intelligence agencies, orchestrated a successful coup d'état on 11 September 1973, and the leader of the coup, Augusto Pinochet, seized power.

The UP's early economic success was short lived. Despite winning the presidential election, the legislative and judicial powers were still held by the opposition, making it difficult for the government to legislate. The United States, under the Nixon administration, prevented the renegotiation of national debt and placed an embargo on goods from nationalized companies. In response to these efforts, Allende expanded the money supply, and inflation skyrocketed. Food shortages worsened as the embargo limited imports and hoarding in the black market limited access to food.

Platform 
The UP promoted the peaceful transition to socialism. This primarily involved the nationalizing of certain industries and agrarian reform. The UP intended to nationalize basic sources of wealth held by foreign companies and internal monopolies. This included mining of copper, nitrate, iodine, iron, and coal; the country's financial system, especially private banks and insurance companies; foreign trade; production and distribution of electricity; air, rail, and maritime transportation; all petroleum based goods; iron, steel, cement, and paper. Agrarian reform would include the expropriation of latifundios, or large holdings of land. In addition to these policies, the UP promoted improved social security and public health, an improved and expanded housing sector, gender equality, and the extension of the right to organize unions.

Policies 
The expropriation of the first company, a textile factory, was announced on December 2, 1970. Others followed over the next several months, and the opposition congress unanimously approved a constitutional reform for the nationalization of copper and other resources, expropriating large foreign companies without compensation. There was considerable redistribution of income and falling unemployment. Only the banks resisted the UP’s attempts to nationalize them.

The main beneficiaries of both Eduardo Frei and Allende Land Reform were the peasants already working the land. The process was similar to that of sharecropping, in which the owners of the land pay people to work the land. The peasants working the land keep a percentage of the profit, the rest goes to the owner. The reform policies rarely addressed the small land holders, turning them against the Allende. Although the UP did not gain full power of the government with Allende’s election, it did gain the administrative and economic ability to limit the power of business owners through expropriations and strengthen the urban working classes and rural peasantry. One large difference between Christian Democrat and Popular Unity governments was their reactions to tomas, or seizures of land by the peasants. Frei’s government would not expropriate any land that had been seized, but Allende accelerated expropriations. This led to a massive movement to seize land. In 1967, there were 9 seizures, but in 1971, there were 1,278. Half of these seizures occurred on farms below the land limit of expropriation. The government established peasant councils that were supposed to represent peasant interests. Their failure in doing this played a large role in Allende’s loss of favor among the peasantry. A series of programs, including pay equality, resulted in diminishing incentives to work, and productivity fell. The agrarian reform under Popular Unity resulted in a significant rise in peasant standard of living, an increase in peasant political awareness and activity, and the expropriation of all latifundios. It also was not as extensive, or as successful, as it was expected to be, and Allende lost their potential support.

Composition (1969–1973)

Electoral results

Symbols

See also 
Popular Front (Chile)
Democratic Alliance (Chile)

References

External links
Salvador Allende's "Last Words" Spanish text with English translation. The transcript of the last radio broadcast of Chilean President Salvador Allende, made on September 11, 1973.
A brief history of Chile. Covering the earliest known humans in the area until the turn of the century.
Augusto Pinochet. Britannica summary of Pinochet's life.

Communist Party of Chile
Defunct left-wing political party alliances
Defunct political party alliances in Chile
Presidency of Salvador Allende
Presidential Republic (1925–1973)
Popular fronts